Sentinels is a public artwork by American artist Jon Barlow Hudson, located at the bottom of the Brady Street pedestrian bridge over North Lincoln Memorial Drive, which is in Milwaukee, Wisconsin, United States. It was commissioned as a part of the Wisconsin Percent for Art Program.

Description
Sentinels was constructed in March 2005 out of Wisconsin red granite. It consists of three monoliths with the tallest one being 15 feet high. Each monolith is features its own unique carved design. Hudson drew his inspiration for this sculpture from ts'ung tubes, which are Chinese jade ritual objects.

Historical information
Sentinels was commissioned by the Milwaukee County Department of Parks, Recreation and Culture for a competition for the new Brady Street pedestrian bridge. It is a two part sculpture with the other part Compass (Hudson) placed at the top of the pedestrian bridge.

See also
 Compass (Hudson)

References

External links
 Jon Hudson's Website

Outdoor sculptures in Milwaukee
2005 sculptures
Granite sculptures in Wisconsin
2005 establishments in Wisconsin